E. frontalis may refer to :
 Eoscatophagus frontalis, a fossil fish species from the Eocene of Northern Italy
 Epophthalmia frontalis, a dragonfly species in the genus Epophthalmia

See also 
 Frontalis (disambiguation)